Broken Glass may refer to:

Broken Glass (play), by Arthur Miller
Broken Glass (band), a British rock band
Broken Glass (album), by American band Crowbar
Broken Glass (EP), an EP by Cat's Eyes
"Broken Glass" (Kygo and Kim Petras song), 2020
"Broken Glass" (Rachel Platten song), 2017
"Broken Glass", a song by Three Days Grace from the 2012 album, Transit Of Venus
"Broken Glass", a song by Buckcherry from 15
"Broken Glass", a song by Sia Furler from the 2016 album This Is Acting
"Broken Glass", a song by The Crystal Method from the 2004 album Legion of Boom

See also

Kristallnacht ("Night of Broken Glass")
"Walking on Broken Glass", a song by Annie Lennox
Breaking glass (disambiguation)
Shattered glass (disambiguation)